Salacca is a genus of about 20 species of palms native to Southeast Asia and the eastern Himalayas. They are dioecious (with the exception of Salak Bali) and pollinated by Curculionidae beetles.

They are very short-stemmed palms, with leaves up to 6–8 m long. The leaves have a spiny petiole; in most species they are pinnate with numerous leaflets, but some species, notably S. magnifica, have undivided leaves. The fruit grow in clusters at the base of the plants, and are edible in many species, with a reddish-brown scaly skin covering a white pulp and one to two large inedible seeds. The Salak (S. zalacca) or snake fruit is the species most widely grown for its fruit; the firm white pulp has a slight acidic taste. The skin of the snakefruit has a unique texture not unlike that of a snake's skin, rough to the touch in one direction but smooth in the other.

Species

Salacca acehensis Chikmawati. - Aceh
Salacca affinis Griff. - Borneo, Sumatra, Malaysia
Salacca bakeriana J.Dransf. - Sarawak
Salacca clemensiana Becc. - Borneo, Philippines
Salacca dolicholepis Burret - Sabah
Salacca dransfieldiana Mogea - Kalimantan
Salacca flabellata Furtado - Malaysia
Salacca glabrescens Griff. - Malaysia, Thailand
Salacca graciliflora Mogea - Malaysia
Salacca griffithii A.J.Hend. - Yunnan, Myanmar, Thailand
Salacca lophospatha J.Dransf. & Mogea - Sabah - apparently extinct
Salacca magnifica Mogea - Sabah
Salacca minuta Mogea - Malaysia
Salacca multiflora Mogea - Malaysia
Salacca ramosiana Mogea - Sabah, Philippines
Salacca rupicola J.Dransf. - Sarawak
Salacca sarawakensis Mogea - Sarawak
Salacca secunda Griff. - Assam, Bhutan, Arunachal Pradesh, Myanmar
Salacca stolonifera Hodel - Thailand
Salacca sumatrana Becc. - Sumatra
Salacca vermicularis Becc. - Borneo
Salacca wallichiana Mart. - Malaysia, Thailand, Myanmar, Sumatra
Salacca zalacca (Gaertn.) Voss - Java, Sumatra; naturalized in Bali, Lombok, Timor, Malaysia, Maluku, Philippines, Sulawesi

References

 
Arecaceae genera
Dioecious plants